The 2015 UEFA Women's Champions League Final was the final match of the 2014–15 UEFA Women's Champions League, the 14th season of the UEFA Women's Champions League football tournament and the sixth since it was renamed from the UEFA Women's Cup. The match was played at the Friedrich-Ludwig-Jahn-Sportpark in Berlin on 14 May 2015.

1. FFC Frankfurt won the match 2–1 against Paris Saint-Germain.

Road to the final

Note: In all results below, the score of the finalist is given first (H: home; A: away).

Match

Summary

Frankfurt dominated the match early on, having two opportunities to score within the first ten minutes. While the German side had more possession over the course of the first half, further chances were scarce until Kerstin Garefrekes served a ball to Célia Šašić on the wide post, giving Frankfurt the lead in the 32nd minute. The goal seemed to wake up the PSG players, who now became more active themselves. A corner kick in the 40th minute was delivered short to Kenza Dali, who crossed the ball high into the box, where Marie-Laure Delie headed it into the net.

The second half started like the first, with Frankfurt controlling the match. It was until the 66th minute that PSG were able to create their first chance, when Laura Georges headed the ball wide. Frankfurt urged for the decisive goal before extra time, having two good chances through Simone Laudehr (81') and Mandy Islacker (87'). The latter got a second chance two minutes into injury time and scored after capturing the ball in the box. PSG started one last charge in the closing stages of the match, creating a chance for Shirley Cruz Traña (90+4'), who missed, winning Frankfurt their record fourth title.

Details

Statistics

References

External links
2014–15 UEFA Women's Champions League
2015 final: Berlin

Uefa Women's Champions League Final 2015
2015
2014–15 UEFA Women's Champions League
Sports competitions in Berlin
Uefa
Uefa